The Austrian 2. Landesliga is the fifth tier of football in Austria. It is divided among the Austrian states by one or more conferences. The champions of each conference are promoted to the Landesliga.
Burgenland: 2. Liga Nord, 2. Liga Mitte and 2. Liga Süd
Lower Austria: 2. Landesliga Ost and 2. Landesliga West
Wien: 2. Landesliga
Carinthia and East Tyrol: Unterliga Ost and Unterliga West
Upper Austria: Landesliga Ost and Landesliga West
Styria: Oberliga Nord, Oberliga Mitte West and Oberliga Süd Ost
Salzburg: 2. Landesliga Nord and 2. Landesliga Süd
Tyrol (without East Tyrol): Landesliga Ost and Landesliga West
Vorarlberg: Landesliga

External links
2. Landesliga Ost of Lower Austria
2. Landesliga West of Lower Austria

 
5
Austria